The second USS Crockett (PGM-88/PG-88) was a  in the United States Navy during the Vietnam War.

Crockett was laid down by the Tacoma Boatbuilding Company, Tacoma, Washington,  and commissioned 24 June 1967.

Homeported in San Diego, Crockett served off the coast of Vietnam as part of Operation Market Time.

Crockett transferred to the Naval Reserve Force on 1 July 1975 and was decommissioned on 1 October 1976. On 15 December 1976, she was struck from the Naval Vessel Register, and on 1 April 1977, ownership was transferred to the Environmental Protection Agency.

R/V Rachel Carson
Once transferred to the EPA, the vessel was renamed for American environmentalist Rachel Carson. At the time, it was the largest limnological vessel on the Great Lakes, and her initial use was monitoring and analyzing pollution in Lake Erie. 

The Rachel Carson was declared excess to EPA needs in 1982 and was transferred to the state of Illinois, and thence to the Combined Great Lakes Navy Association.

She has since been scrapped.

References

 
 

Asheville-class gunboats
1966 ships
Ships built by Tacoma Boatbuilding Company
Asheville-class gunboats of the United States Environmental Protection Agency